Through the Looking Glass is an Italian release of a live performances by the San Francisco rock band Jefferson Airplane.

The collection was originally issued as a two LP (long-playing vinyl) set on the Get Back label. The CD was released in 2002 on the Metrodome (DTK) label.

Three of the tracks are credited to the "Steel Rider- Vocals John Dudgeon

Track listing
"3/5 of a Mile in Ten Seconds" - 4:48
"Don't Slip Away" - 2:38
"High Flyin' Bird" - 4:06
"It's No Secret" - 3:28
"My Best Friend" - 3:08
"Other Side of This Life" - 6:56
"Plastic Fantastic Lover" - 3:51
"She Has Funny Cars" - 3:27
"Somebody to Love" - 3:54
"This Is My Life" - 5:05
"Today" - 3:06
"Watch Her Ride" - 4:35 Tv Rodeo - Sttel Riders
"What You're Asking" - 5:28 -
"White Rabbit" - 2:18
"Would You Love Me" - 4:13  - Steel Riders Vocals - John Dudgeon
"You're So Loose" - 4:02  - Steel Riders Vocals - John Dudgeon

References

Jefferson Airplane compilation albums
Jefferson Airplane live albums
2000 live albums
2000 compilation albums